The 2017 Eldora Dirt Derby 150 was the 11th stock car race of the 2017 NASCAR Camping World Truck Series and the fifth iteration of the event. The race was held on Wednesday, July 19, 2017, in Rossburg, Ohio at Eldora Speedway, a  permanent oval dirt track. The race took the scheduled 150 laps to complete. At race's end, Matt Crafton, driving for ThorSport Racing, would take control of the race on the final restart with 18 laps to go to win his 14th careerNASCAR Camping World Truck Series win and his only win of the season. To fill out the podium, Stewart Friesen of Halmar Friesen Racing and Chase Briscoe of Brad Keselowski Racing would finish second and third, respectively.

Background 

Located north of Rossburg, Ohio in the village of New Weston, Ohio, it features permanent and festival-style seating believed to be in the range of 30,000. The 22,000 permanent grandstand and VIP suite seats make it the largest sports stadium in the Dayton, Ohio-region according to the Dayton Business Journal.

Entry list 

 (R) denotes rookie driver.
 (i) denotes driver who is ineligible for series driver points.

*Withdrew due to blowing an engine on their heat qualifying lap.

Practice

First practice 
The first practice session was held on Tuesday, July 18, at 7:00 PM EST, and would last for 55 minutes.

Second and final practice 
The second and final practice session, sometimes referred to as Happy Hour, was held on Tuesday, July 18, at 9:00 PM EST, and would last for 55 minutes.

Qualifying 
Qualifying for the five heats took place on Wednesday, July 19, at 5:00 PM EST. Each driver would have two laps to set a fastest time; the fastest of the two would count as their official qualifying lap. Qualifying would set the grid positions for the heats; first would get first in heat one, second first in heat two, etc in a repeating order until the slowest car.

Time Trials

Heat #1

Heat #2

Heat #3

Heat #4

Heat #5

Last Chance Qualifier 
The Last Chance Qualifier was held Wednesday, July 19, at 8:45 PM EST. The race was held for all other drivers that were not guaranteed a starting spot in the main feature, with the top seven drivers in the event qualifying to the main feature, leaving one driver to not qualify. Bobby Pierce would win the Last Chance Qualifier and take the 26th spot. At race's end, Tommy Regan, retiring after two laps due to handling issues, would be the only driver to fail to qualify.

Full starting lineup

Race results 
Stage 1 Laps: 40

Stage 2 Laps: 50

Stage 3 Laps: 60

Standings after the race 

Drivers' Championship standings

Note: Only the first 8 positions are included for the driver standings.

References 

2017 NASCAR Camping World Truck Series
NASCAR races at Eldora Speedway
July 2017 sports events in the United States
2017 in sports in Ohio